Raymond Charles Smith (3 August 1935 – 12 December 2001) was an English cricketer active from 1955 to 1964 who played for Leicestershire. He was born in Duddington and died in St Lucia. He appeared in 104 first-class matches as a righthanded batsman who bowled slow left arm orthodox spin. He scored 1,115 runs with a highest score of 36 and took 203 wickets with a best performance of seven for 54.

Notes

 
1935 births
2001 deaths
English cricketers
Leicestershire cricketers